Siguldas Elpa is a regional newspaper published in Latvia.

Mass media in Sigulda
Newspapers published in Latvia